Prabhu Helicopter is a helicopter airline based at Pokhara International Airport in Pokhara, Nepal, operating chartered helicopter services. The company was established in 2015 under the Air Operators Certificate issued by the Government of Nepal as a subsidiary of the Prabhu Group. The Company carries domestic chartered helicopter flights throughout Nepal out and Rescue Missions.

History 
The Airline was founded by the Prabhu Bank, which acquired Muktinath Airlines, a Nepali helicopter airline operating a single Robinson R44 based in Pokhara.

In 2018, the airline was the first airline of Nepal to introduce the Robinson R66 in Nepal. In 2018, the airline opened its second hub at Tribhuvan International Airport in Kathmandu.

Fleet
The Prabhu Helicopter fleet consists of the following aircraft (as of January 2023):

Former fleet

References

Airlines of Nepal
Helicopter airlines
Airlines established in 1997
1997 establishments in Nepal